The Hurricane Ivan tornado outbreak was a three-day tornado outbreak that was associated with the passage of Hurricane Ivan across the Southern United States starting on September 15, 2004 across the Gulf Coast states of Alabama and Florida as well as southern Georgia before ending in the Middle Atlantic Coast on September 18.

The outbreak killed 7 people and injured dozens of others across several states from Florida to Pennsylvania. The hurricane itself killed at least 90 people from the US to the eastern Caribbean Islands. Overall it produced 120 tornadoes surpassing the record of 117 that was previously held by Hurricane Beulah during the 1967 Atlantic hurricane season. Ivan also produced 16 more tornadoes than Hurricane Frances which struck most of the same regions (the tornado outbreak) about ten days earlier. The tornado outbreak is also the largest in Virginia history.

Meteorological synopsis

On September 13, 2004, as Category 5 hurricane Ivan moved through the Yucatán Channel, the Storm Prediction Center noted the possibility of isolated tornadoes for parts of Louisiana and the Florida Panhandle three days out. Though the storm weakened while approaching the United States, strong low-level wind shear along its northeastern periphery allowed for the development of potentially tornadic supercells. A National Oceanic and Atmospheric Administration Hurricane Hunter aircraft intercepted Ivan during the afternoon and evening of September 15. During the mission, dropwindsondes were deployed off the Gulf Coast to assess the rainband environment. By this time, an intense band of thunderstorms, with embedded supercells, developed about 250 mi (400 km) east of the hurricane's center. A thermodynamic sounding around 1:00 p.m. EST from Tampa Bay, Florida revealed unusually favorable conditions for deep, rotating convection. Ahead of the band, convective available potential energy (CAPE) levels reached 2,500 J/kg and significant helicity. The significant levels of CAPE, accompanied by a dry air intrusion between the rainband and the main convection of Ivan, were the primary cause of the outbreak. A comparison between Ivan and Hurricane Jeanne revealed that both storms encountered similar conditions near landfall; however, CAPE values were lower during Jeanne and the system produced far fewer tornadoes.

In light of the increased tornado threat, the first tornado watch was issued around 1:00 p.m. EST for the Florida Panhandle and southern Alabama. By then, "miniature" supercell thunderstorms began approaching the coastline. Data from Doppler weather radar indicated mesocyclones within several of the cells, though mostly while over water. At the onset of the outbreak, three cells exhibited signature characteristics of supercell thunderstorms: cyclonic updraft and a hook-like appendage. Similar to storms over the Great Plains, a mid-level rear flank downdraft was present; however, this feature did not reach the surface. Less than an hour after the watch was issued, the first tornado of the outbreak touched down in Escambia County, Florida. Over the course of the next 20 hours, the National Weather Service (NWS) office in Tallahassee monitored over 50 mesocyclones that had sufficient vorticity to spawn tornadoes. The high number of potential storms led to the issuance of 130 tornado warnings, of which only 20 later verified. One of the mesocyclones had a "nearly textbook appearance" and produced four tornadoes between 8:15 p.m. and 9:50 p.m. as it traveled nearly 75 miles across the Florida Big Bend. Two of these tornadoes reached F2 intensity and, collectively, they killed four people, injured eight more, and left $5.5 million in damage. By midnight on September 15, 26 tornadoes had touched down across three states.

With the tornado threat gradually moving northward, new tornado watches were issued further north into much of South Carolina. During the first half of September 16, several F0 tornadoes touched down across the Southeast. By the afternoon, downstream subsidence limited thunderstorm activity; however, as the day wore on, sufficient warm, moist air from the Gulf Stream and breaks in cloud cover allowed for CAPE values to rise. Extensive convective banding to the north and east of the storm continued to encounter extreme levels of helicity. Subsequently, numerous rotating thunderstorms developed over the region, especially across Georgia and South Carolina. Throughout the afternoon, 22 tornadoes touched down across the two states, one of which, an F2, killed one person. The majority of the activity took place along a warm front that developed east of Tropical Storm Ivan within the shear maxima.

Following a lull in activity during the overnight hours between September 16 and 17, conditions once more became increasingly favorable for tornadoes across North Carolina and Virginia. Strong shear associated with the weakening tropical cyclone and the destabilization of air ahead of the main rainband and consequently, a tornado watch was issued for portions of both states around 10:00 a.m.

Tornado event

The tornado outbreak began during the early afternoon of September 15, when the first outer rain bands and thunderstorms moved ashore across the southern states. One person was killed in Panama City, Florida when a tornado tore through the city damaging many businesses. The tornado that hit just before 4:00 p.m. was caught on camera as it skirted just outside a local television station that was doing severe weather coverage as tornado warnings were issued in the Panama City media market area. At the same time, another deadly tornado touched down in Bay County, Florida killing 1 when a wood-frame home was lifted and smashed, killing an occupant. Later during the evening many other tornadoes touched down across the Panhandle region of west Florida. An F2 tornado in Calhoun County, Florida tossed mobile homes in the air, killing two occupants in each of 2 mobile homes. At the same time the center of the hurricane was approaching the Florida/southern Alabama state and coastline near Gulf Shores. At least 26 tornadoes were confirmed during the day.

After the cyclone made landfall near Gulf Shores, Alabama, the tornado activity shifted further north into central Alabama and the northern half of Georgia as well as South Carolina. One person was killed in Franklin County, Georgia by an F2 tornado that damaged several businesses and homes. 32 tornadoes were confirmed on that day. As the remnants of Ivan, now a tropical depression moved further inland, increased instability and thunderstorm cells produced a large tornado outbreak from the northern Carolinas to Pennsylvania. Virginia was the hardest hit state during the day as nearly 40 tornadoes affected the state. Several F2s and one F3 touched down, causing significant damage to numerous structures including homes and businesses. Areas roughly to the west and south of Washington, D.C. were the hardest hit areas. Nearly 60 tornadoes were confirmed on that day before the outbreak ceased during the overnight hours of September 18 across Maryland.

Confirmed tornadoes

September 15 event

September 16 event

September 17 event

September 18 event

See also 

 Tornadoes of 2004
 List of North American tornadoes and tornado outbreaks
 List of tornadoes spawned by tropical cyclones
 2004 Atlantic hurricane season

Notes

References

External links
 NWS Raleigh tornado and severe weather event summary

Tornadoes of 2004
F3 tornadoes
2004 natural disasters in the United States
Tornadoes in Florida
Tornadoes in Georgia (U.S. state)
Tornadoes in Virginia
Tornadoes in Pennsylvania
Hurricane Ivan
September 2004 events in North America
Ivan tornado outbreak